Lincoln Clarkes (born 1957) is a Canadian photographer. He has won National Magazine Awards, silver; and Western Magazine Awards, gold.

He has published three books, Heroines (2002), Views (2005) and Cyclists (2013) and has been the subject of two documentary films.
Heroines (Anvil Press]) is an epic photographic documentary of 400 addicted women of Vancouver’s Downtown Eastside, which won the 2003 Vancouver Book Award (in a tie with Stan Douglas), and was the subject of numerous philosophical essays (by Margot Leigh Butler, and Paul Ugor, among them). The London Observer said Clarkes' book offered  "beauty in a beastly place." Globe and Mail called it "intimate, compelling and undeniably unsettling," while The Toronto Star called it "incredibly powerful." In the summer of 2017, the Canadian art collector Bob Rennie purchased the entire Heorines photographic collection and archive.

Views, a retrospective of his works (Universal/Northern Electric), included a 17 song original soundtrack, featuring songs by Herald Nix, Rae Spoon and others.

Quattro Books published Clarkes' third book of photography, Cyclists, in 2013. A selection of 150 men and women riding bicycles, the book documents the cycling movement in Toronto.

In 2001, Peace Arch Entertainment produced a one-hour documentary film about Clarkes' Heroines project called, Heroines: A Photographic Obsession Heroines: A Photographic Obsession, which has aired on BRAVO! and Women's Television Network and has screened at numerous festivals.

In 2011 Clarkes was featured in Bob Barrett's television documentary series Snapshots: The Art of Photography Snapshots: The Art of Photography (Network Knowledge Network). The program features Clarkes’ accounts of many of his significant photographic series, including Shot in America, Portraits of Women in Texas with their Guns, and Anti-War Protesters.  It was filmed while Clarkes was living on the top floor of Vancouver's historical Sylvia Hotel. In 2016, the actor Tony Pantages portrayed Clarkes in director Rachel Talalay's Leo Award-winning film (for Best TV Film), called On The Farm.

Clarkes has had solo exhibitions in Vancouver, Toronto and Seattle. His photographs have been used in the feature films Everything's Gone Green, by Douglas Coupland, and Atom Egoyan's The Sweet Hereafter. Clarkes' portrait work includes Helmut Newton, Oliver Stone, Vivianne Westwood, Noam Chomsky, Timothy Leary and Patti Smith.

Clarkes dropped out of Emily Carr University of Art and Design, where he was studying painting, to take up photography, for which he is self-taught. He had a solo exhibition of his paintings at Heffel Gallery in 1983, largely due to his street-art practice. At the time, he founded a fashion boutique and fronted an art-wave band.

"In the style of Lewis Hine or Dorothy Lange, [Clarkes'] work chronicles a particular segment of society with the intention of educating, affecting change in societal perceptions and, one would hope, influencing social policy," wrote Jesseca White, in sub-Terrain magazine. A reviewer in arts magazine Border Crossings wrote, "The world would be a better place if there were more noticers: People who take the time to listen hard and watch closely. Lincoln Clarkes is a noticer." In the London journal Philosophy of Photography, Kelly Wood argues that "the Heroines series’ blurs the boundaries between commercial, documentary and fine art photography."

References

General references

1. National Magazine Awards: "Past Awards"

2. Western Magazine Awards "Awards History"

3. Anvil Press: "Publication catalogue"

4. Northern Electric: "Publication catalogue"

5. Peace Arch Entertainment "List of Films"

External links

 Los Angeles Times: "Light and Darkness in Canada," by John M. Glionna, (June 1, 2003)"
 The Observer: "Macabre portraits haunt nation" by Christopher Reed (June 8, 2003)"
 VICE: "Lincoln Clarkes's Vintage Photographs of Vancouver's Female Addicts Are Incredible, Nadja Sayej"
 Huffington Post (USA): "These Photos Of Female Heroin Addicts Reveal The Power Of Addiction, Nov. 11, 2013"
 Agnostica Lincoln Clarkes: "Cyclists"
 Decoration Digest (Spain): "Heroines internal Strength and Beauty by Lincoln Clarkes"
 Scottish Word Image Group (Scotland): "Failing the Feminine: Photographed Words in Lincoln Clarkes’ Heroines, Nancy Pedri"
 Epi Paideia (Italy): "Lincoln Clarkes: la bellezza svanita nei ritratti delle donne tossicodipendenti, Aneta Ozonek, Feb. 7, 2014"
 Delas Contemporano (São Paulo, Brazil): "Fotógrafo registra submundo da heroína para alertar autoridades; Renata Reif, Jan. 28, 2014"
 Dattualita la Republica (Italy): La fotodenuncia: i ritratti delle donne eroinomani di Vancouver, Frederico Biserni
 Academia.edu (San Francisco, USA): Imagine the Invisible, Naming Suffering: Lincoln Clarkes, Photography and the Women of Downtown Eastside Vancouver, Paul Ugor
 Lifelounge (Australia): The Heroines of Vancouver's downtown eastside by Lincoln Clarkes
 Geist Magazine: " Lincoln Clarkes, The Eastside Portraits," by Patty Osborne (October 15, 2009)"
 The Georgia Straight (Vancouver): Lincoln Clarkes turns his lens on Toronto's Cyclists. Robin Laurence; Oct. 2, 2013
 HuffPost British Columbia: Lincoln Clarkes' 'Heroines' On Display At Vancouver Museum
 Woodsquat (Vancouver): The Hero of Heroines, Photographs by Lincoln Clarkes, Margot Leigh Butler, Dec. 2004
 Maisonneuve (Montreal): Corpus Delecti Media, morality and Vancouver's missing women
 Quill & Quire (Toronto): Heroines by Lincoln Clarkes, Reviewed by Nick Gamble, Feb. 2003
 Capture Photography Festival (Vancouver): An Evolutionary Look into Vancouver Street Photography Jan. 10, 2013 – Jan. 31, 2014
 The Vancouver Sun:  Capture Festival puts focus on Vancouver photography scene; Mar. 20, 2013

Video
 The Knowledge Network, Snapshot: The Art of Photography II: Lincoln Clarkes
 
 Shaw TV, The Rush, 
 CBC News, Arts & Entertainment: Glamour of bicycles: Lincoln Clarkes on his new book Cyclists

1957 births
Canadian photographers
Living people